Walter Muir Whitehill (1905 – 1978) was an American writer, historian, medievalist, and the Director and Librarian of the Boston Athenaeum from 1946 to 1973. He was also editor for publications of the Colonial Society of Massachusetts from 1946 to 1978.  From 1951 to 1972 Whitehill was a professor at Harvard University.

Whitehill's father of the same name was an Episcopalian minister.  The younger Whitehill received his AB and AM degrees from Harvard in 1926 and 1929. Shortly after this he married Jane Revere Coolidge, a descendant of Thomas Jefferson and eldest daughter of Julian Coolidge.  He then went to England where he received a Ph.D. from the University of London. In 1932 he did in Santiago de Compostela the first full transcription of the medieval Codex Calixtinus.

Whitehill was selected to deliver an important televised address about the history and development of Boston on the occasion of the Bicentennial Celebration of the United States.  On July 11, 1976, he spoke at the Old State House in the presence of Queen Elizabeth II, the Mayor of Boston, the Governor of Massachusetts, and a large audience. The text of his address was printed in a publication by the Bostonian Society, which operates the Old State House on behalf of the National Park Service. He delivered the commencement address in 1974 at the College of William and Mary.

Although Whitehill's publishing career focused on Bostoniana, his significant work on Spanish medieval topics represented the first American interest in the subject.

Publications
 Ernest J. King and Walter Muir Whitehill, Fleet Admiral King: A Naval Record. New York City: W. W. Norton Company, 1952.   
Boston, A Topographical History, Third Edition, Enlarged, with Lawrence W. Kennedy, 2000. Hardcover , Paperback .  Read a review at h-net.org.
Boston in the Age of John Fitzgerald Kennedy. University of Oklahoma Press, 1966. LCCN 66-10289
Boston Prints and Printmakers, 1670-1775, with Sinclair H. Hitchings, 1982.

See also
 Codex Calixtinus

References

External links
Walter Muir Whitehill Prize in Early American History

Dictionary of Art Historians bio of Whitehill
 Boston Athenaeum. Portrait of Whitehill, with bibliography

1905 births
1978 deaths
Writers from Cambridge, Massachusetts
Harvard University alumni
Alumni of the University of London
Harvard University faculty
20th century in Boston
Burials at Monticello
20th-century American historians
American male non-fiction writers
Historians from Massachusetts
20th-century American male writers